The 1946–47 United States collegiate men's ice hockey season was the 53rd season of collegiate ice hockey in the United States.

Regular season

Standings

References

1946–47 NCAA Standings

External links
College Hockey Historical Archives

 
College